Top Chef Canada is a Canadian reality competition television series and is considered one of the most prestigious culinary competitions in Canada. The show premiered on April 11, 2011, on Food Network Canada. The first season consisted of 13 episodes, with 16 contestants vying for a grand prize of $100,000 and a GE Monogram kitchen valued at $30,000. Like the original American series, each week the chef contestants compete against each other in culinary challenges. Contestants are judged by a panel of professional chefs and other notables from the food and wine industry, with one or more contestants being eliminated each week. The Canadian edition uses the same graphics and music as the American version of the program.

The first season of Top Chef Canada was one of Food Network Canada's most highly rated programs. The network renewed the program for a second season, which began to air on March 12, 2012. Top Chef Canada returned in 2017 with an all-stars edition for the fifth season. Season 6 of Top Chef Canada returned April 8, 2018, with a lineup of 11 chefs from the next generation.

The tenth season premiered on September 26, 2022.

Judges, guest judges, and special appearances

The host for the first season of the Canadian program was Thea Andrews. After giving birth to her second child, Andrews stepped down from the position. On November 15, 2011, actress Lisa Ray announced that she was named as host.  Beginning in Season 5 Toronto-born Eden Grinshpan took over hosting duties. Trained at Le Cordon Bleu Grinshpan is co-founder and executive chef at Middle Eastern restaurant DEZ in New York City and host of Eden Eats and Log On and Eat with Eden Grinshpan on the Cooking Channel.

The head judge is Mark McEwan, chef and owner of several restaurants in Toronto, including ONE in Yorkville and Bymark in the Toronto-Dominion Centre as well as host of the Food Network Canada program The Heat with Mark McEwan. In preparation for elimination challenges, contestants shop for ingredients at McEwan Gourmet Grocery located at the Shops at Don Mills.

The "resident judge" (the position held by Gail Simmons in the original version) was Shereen Arazm, a Toronto native and owner of several Los Angeles-area restaurants. Beginning in later seasons, the show introduced three new resident judges, who include Chris Nuttal-Smith, Janet Zuccarini and Mijune Pak.

In Season 6, guest judges included chef-owners of distinguished Toronto restaurants, such as Lynn Crawford (Ruby Watchco), Susur Lee (Fring's, Lee), Rob Gentile (Buca, Bar Buca) and Alexandra Feswick (Drake Devonshire). Top Chef Canada alumni returning as guest judges included Steve Gonzales of Baro, Dustin Gallagher of 416 Snack Bar as well as Top Chef Canada: All-Stars winner, Nicole Gomes of Calgary's Cluck ‘N’ Cleaver. Additionally, Evan Funke, L.A.-based chef and co-owner (with Janet Zuccarini) of Felix restaurant, and Danny Bowien, chef-owner of New York's Mission Chinese Food join as guest judges.

Seasons

Notes

 Season 5 was an "All Star" season; Gomes originally appeared in Season 3, and Gallagher originally appeared in Season 1.

References

External links

 
 

Food Network (Canadian TV channel) original programming
2011 Canadian television series debuts
2010s Canadian reality television series
2010s Canadian cooking television series
 
English-language television shows
Canadian television spin-offs
Reality television spin-offs
Television series by Corus Entertainment
Cooking competitions in Canada
Canadian television series based on American television series
Television series by Universal Television
Television series by Insight Productions